Balsamud is a village in Rajpur Tehsil of Barwani district in the Indian state of Madhya Pradesh. Balsamud is noted for its Integrated Border Check Post at Agra Mumbai Highway run by the Government of Madhya Pradesh.

Geography
It has an average elevation of 306 metres (1,007 feet).
Balsamud lies 45 km from District headquarters.

References

External links
 Barwani District

Barwani
Villages in Barwani district